In the fictional universe of Warhammer 40,000, the Imperial Guard is the army of the Imperium in the Warhammer 40,000 tabletop miniature wargame.

The Imperial Guard, now known as the "Astra Militarum", are a specific army or faction in the Warhammer 40,000 and Epic tabletop games and universe. The army itself is characterised by being capable of fielding a multitude of lightly armoured infantry in combination with some of the toughest and most powerful tanks in the game. In the game universe, the Imperial Guard is a colossal military organisation consisting of roughly 500 trillion men and women supported by at least a few hundred billion Armoured vehicles each from thousands of different systems within the Imperium of Man.

The Imperial Guard was first introduced to the game in White Dwarf 109, January 1989. In April 2014 a new codex was released for the 6th Edition of the game, along with a number of new plastic kits. Such models included plastic versions of Ogryns and Militarum Tempestus Scions (previously named Stormtroopers) which had been metal. A plastic kit of the Hydra (previously a Forge World model) also became available. In addition to the new kits and models, the Imperial Guard had a name change to the Astra Militarum in line with Games Workshop's shift away from generic naming of their intellectual property.

Overview
The Astra Militarum (previously the Imperial Guard and the Imperial Army) is a fictional colossal military organisation, consisting of many hundreds of thousands of armies throughout the Imperium, and forming the vast bulk of the Imperium's military machine. Unlike the Space Marines, an elite unit that rely upon precision strikes against the enemy's critical assets to carry the day, the Astra Militarum has the reputation of relying on massed assaults made up of nearly endless waves of infantry and armour to achieve victory. "If a Space Marine assault is likened to a surgeon`s scalpel, the Astra Militarum assault is likened to a sledgehammer blow" It is this battlefield strategy that has earned the organisation the moniker "The Hammer of the Emperor". It also earns the Guard the reputation as a meatgrinder, whose most infamous or desperate commanders are more than willing to waste their soldiers' lives for the smallest of gains or in the most suicidal defensive actions. In truth, most Imperial commanders are highly trained and skilled career soldiers who have learned how to leverage the vast resources of the Imperium for maximum effect.

Origins
The origins of the Astra Militarum are shrouded in history, all the way to the Great Crusade. This crusade was driven by the Space Marines, the Adeptus Astartes, each the equivalent of a dozen normal soldiers. Despite this, the Legions of the Astartes were finite and the scale of the crusade demanded more manpower, and hence the Imperial Army was created. The Imperial Army became a vital part of the Great Crusade, forming the vast majority of the troops involved, numbering in the billions, but still subordinate to the Adeptus Astartes and their Legions. First used as garrison troops, or given clean up duties behind the advance of the Legions, they were considered 'second line'. When the Crusade reached the Eastern Fringe, the Imperial Army was beginning to be utilized in the front line alongside their Astartes brothers. An organizational structure change was forced by the defection of Warmaster Horus, triggering a civil war in the Imperium, now dubbed the Horus Heresy. In the time following to prevent the possibility of large-scale rebellion occurring again, the titanic armies of the Imperial forces were divided. The Imperial Army ceased to exist, and the Imperial Guard was formed in its place. The Imperial Guard was reorganized into smaller units known as regiments, and centrally trained Commissars were universally introduced to watch out for disloyalty. Given the nature of Imperial Guard regiments, and their basis of single world dependence, should a regiment rebel, the treachery should be contained locally.

Each Imperial Guard regiment is usually raised from a single world and can number anywhere from several thousand upwards, and vary enormously, and are supported by a huge array of light and heavy armoured vehicles. Each regiment also has its own entourage, consisting of support staff, camp followers, suppliers, tech-priests, psykers, doctors, religious leaders, and the like. When multiple regiments are grouped up into large fighting forces, they are issued far larger and more powerful assets such as planetary-scale artillery and super-heavy tank regiments from thousands of Munitorum armouries, fortresses, and staging worlds, with larger scale deployments taking decades if not centuries of preparation. Although a player may field a mixed force of these armour, artillery, and infantry units on the tabletop, in the game universe, the composition of any one regiment is fairly uniform; that is, an infantry regiment will contain thousands of foot soldiers and are entirely restricted from having any form of heavy armour or artillery, an armoured regiment will consist of little else save its armoured vehicles and support crews with no form of integrated air or artillery support, and an artillery regiment will be focused wholly on the task of providing fire support to front line regiments. This policy was put in place by the Imperium to prevent, or at least minimise, the damage from large scale mutinies in the wake of the Horus Heresy, as no one regiment constitutes a complete self-sufficient fighting force in its own right. However, all guardsmen, from the highest Lord General, to the lowest cook, has the secondary job of being a frontline guardsmen and are expected to know the basics of infantry warfare and the use of the most basic of standard kit. A special handbook, referred to as The Imperial Infantryman's Uplifting Primer, is given to all members of the Guard as a means of informing them on things they may miss out on through training. Should a Primer be vandalised, lost or stolen, its owner faces death.

Regiments are drawn from all types of planets in the Imperium; from Fortress worlds such as Cadia, where the entire populace is raised under arms from birth, to Feral and Medieval worlds, and the contributions of some planets over the ten thousand years of the Imperium run into the billions of regiments, if not more. Every planet in the Imperium, and their associated Planetary Lord or Imperial Governor, is charged with defence of their own world. To accomplish this they raise a train a fighting force, which may take the form of an official military, garrison force, or militia amongst others. These forces are solely for planetary defence and are unlikely to be used in off-world situations. Imperial Guard regiments are sourced from the annual tithe required from each Imperial Governor; no less than one tenth of their overall planetary fighting force, but as much as the Departmento Munitorum require, to join the Emperor's fight in the galaxy as a whole.

The Imperial Guard are constantly at war, freeing worlds from Chaotic or alien influence, or defending them from the same, or most often putting down rebellions or other human based enemies of the Imperium.

The Imperial Guard rely upon the Imperial Navy for transport to and from war zones, orbital bombardment, and most kinds of air support. The Imperium's naval and ground forces are kept strictly separate such that a mutinous general will not have access to an integrated military machine. That was not the case with the pre-Horus Heresy Imperial Army, which had no such strict distinction, resulted in Horus acquiring a powerful fleet in addition to his vast ground forces and numerous worlds being taken over by ambitious commanders who could hold entire systems for ransom knowing that the people there were powerless to stop them

Famous and specialised Imperial Guard regiments

Many regiments of the Imperial Guard do not adhere to the standard Cadian style of warfare displayed on the tabletop. Although Cadian-style regiments are the most common due to Cadians being the poster boys of the Imperial Guard, some regiments from other worlds specialise in other forms of war, a facet they often inherit from the conditions of their home planet. The Catachans hail from a jungle covered 'death world', and so use lighter, more mobile transports rather than heavy, cumbersome ones, specialising in jungle warfare and hostile environments. The Death Korps of Krieg (chiefly inspired from the armies of World War I) have a propensity for sieges and trench warfare, where their suicidal stubbornness and tenacity are most valuable, as well as their unusually large store of biochemical weapons. Some, most notably the Elysian Drop Troopers and the Harakoni Warhawks, rely on aerial deployment and are experts in vertical envelopment. Others, such as the Tallarn Desert Raiders train their men to fight best in certain climates, and adapt their style of warfare around their chosen speciality. While each regiment has strengths and weaknesses, Imperial Planners often are forced to deploy regiments where they are their most ill-suited, Tallarn Desert Raiders on an ice world, Elysian Drop Troopers on an ocean world, Death Korp of Krieg in garrison duty, etc. Oftentimes Imperial planners cannot even be sure which regiments will arrive to a hotzone, as the fickle nature of the warp means one can arrive tomorrow, or a hundred years later.

Equipment

The vast majority of basic Imperial Guard guardsmen are armed with a laser rifle known as a "lasgun" or "lasrifle" which serves as their standard weapon and is the only guaranteed piece of equipment all guardsmen will possess, but even then some will go into battle without one. The Lasgun is cheap, easy to mass-produce, and reliable. While it's a powerful anti-infantry weapon (able to cleanly sever human limbs and blast holes through solid concrete) it's considered a relatively weak weapon against the many inhuman and superhuman enemies the Imperium faces, but in numbers it's capable of damaging just about anything. A lasgun's ammunition comes in the form of a power pack which on a lasgun's standard settings can provide up to 80-120 shots before needing to be recharged, but this is not an issue as the pack can easily be recharged by virtually any heat source whether it be from direct sunlight, use of solar panels, or even throwing it into a campfire, though the latter most option risks damaging the pack, shortening it's lifespan. It can also be overcharged in last-ditch situations turning it into a makeshift grenade, a tactic favored by veterans, but results in the destruction of the weapon. Most lasguns also come with a bayonet lug allowing for a bayonet or other close combat weapon to be attached, useful when assaulting entrenched enemy positions. Combat knives are also standard issue, these can range from basic knives made out of plasteel to mono knives whose edge always stay at their sharpest and never dulls. For protection a guardsman will typically be outfitted in a flak vest, armour similar in principle and design to 21st-century Bulletproof vests, but made from more advanced and durable materials. While the flak vest is seen as a very basic form of combat armour, it is extremely easy to mass-produce and requires little knowledge to repair. Many guardsmen (usually veterans) may also be found carrying an additional sidearm as a backup weapon, usually laspistols (like the Death Korps of Krieg) or autopistols (such as Cadians). Guardsmen can also be issued with a small pack of 2-4 grenades, typically fragmentation, krak, Smoke, and/or photon flash grenades. Although even more specialised or exotic types of grenades can be issued in rare instances, they are normally handed over to more elite soldiers such as scions or specialists such as breachers (Guardsmen specially trained in demolition tactics) instead of the standard rank-and-file guardsman. Scions have access to superior wargear and are specially trained to be able to undertake a variety of advanced missions. They are outfitted in carapace armour which offers superior protection compared to a flak vest, but at the cost of reduced movement speed. However most, if not all scions are given minor genetic enhancements which allows them to bear the extra weight without any problems, nullifying the drawback. They are also armed with a more advanced and powerful version of the lasgun known as a hotshot lasgun and/or hellgun which is much favoured for its superior armour-penetration ability, able to pierce even the mighty power armour of the superhuman Space Marines. Scions are also privileged to request more exotic equipment to be able to fulfill certain missions or to defeat certain targets.

The Imperial Guard can also field a wide range of vehicles, from the amphibious Chimera IFV to the awe-inspiring and terror-inducing Baneblade tank, most of which are usually maintained by members of the Adeptus Mechanicus assigned to their subsequent regiments. Usually not as sophisticated as the vehicles used by Space Marines but effective in their own right, they can be as numerous as the infantry themselves and are shown to be as reliable. Two examples of this would be the mobile artillery piece known as the basilisk, which is known to field both anti-armour and incendiary rounds, not to mention the devastating Earthshaker round. The second example is the Leman Russ main battle tank, a highly versatile armoured unit that has multiple variants that have different main cannons for a variety of situations, from the versatile battle cannon to the deadly, but temperamental plasma destroyer. While they are versatile, it is well known that other forces such as the Orks and the forces of Chaos claim these units for themselves and can be seen fighting against the Imperium. Some units, such as the Baneblade, are even classified by the Imperial Guard as essential for their campaigns due to their incredible prowess in battle, the vehicle in question being a super-heavy tank akin to a mobile fortress 3-4 stories high. When these vehicles are about to fall into enemy hands, Imperial commanders usually scuttle or rescue them at the expense of many of their men. After all, if there is one resource in the Imperium that can be considered "infinite" it's manpower.

Gameplay

History of the Imperial Guard as an army

The first edition of Warhammer 40,000 included rules for a force known as the "Army". Later their name was changed to "Imperial Guard" and then as of 7th edition "Astra Militarum".
The Imperial Guard make up the backbone of the Imperium's armed forces.

The Imperial Guard was initially bound by a series of rules, published in the Warhammer 40,000 Compendium, relating to its command structure. Squads of units formed platoons under a command squad. Units that were separated from the command squad were more limited in action. The initial Imperial Guard army could include, besides the basic squads, Rough Riders (a form of Cavalry), penal units, human bombs, abhumans and robots. Several vehicles were available, including; motorcycles with an optional side-car, Jet cycles (a form of jet propelled motorbike), grav attack vehicles (armoured fighting vehicles utilising anti gravity for propulsion) and Sentinels (a two-legged walker, similar to an AT-ST),.

The first incarnation of the Imperial Guard as a fully supported army was in 1995, with the release of the Codex: Imperial Guard sourcebook for the second edition of Warhammer 40,000. This was the first time that the army itself had specific army rules collected in their own sourcebook. With the release of the third edition of the game, almost all the Warhammer 40,000 armies eventually had new codices compatible with the new edition. In line with this, Codex: Imperial Guard was released in 1999, followed by Codex: Catachans in 2001. This was a smaller sourcebook (or mini-dex/mini-codex) that was meant to be used in conjunction with the "parent" Codex: Imperial Guard. The mini-dex itself provided even more specific rules for fielding one of the more popular Imperial Guard sub-armies, the Catachan Jungle Fighters, for which plastic models were available. In 2003, Games Workshop conducted the Eye of Terror worldwide campaign and released a corresponding sourcebook, Codex: Eye of Terror. This campaign sourcebook contained various rules, including a specific army list for another one of the Imperial Guard's notable sub-armies, the Cadian Shock Troops. Soon after the campaign ended, the changes in the Cadian Shock Troops army list were integrated into the Imperial Guard rules, and Games Workshop released a second, revamped version of Codex: Imperial Guard.

In the actual in-universe background, the predecessors to the Imperial Guard was the Imperial Army alongside innumerable Imperial Cults and Militias present throughout the Great Crusade, but also more elite forces, such as the Solar Auxilia. However, after the Horus Heresy, the Imperial Army was split into the Imperial Guard and Navy to prevent either force from either having the ability to their gain quick access to transportation or field occupational troops quickly if any of their divisional units turned traitor.

Overview 
Individual guardsmen are weak, thus Imperial Guard armies are usually rather large. In addition, they have access to various vehicles, such as the Leman Russ main battle tank, Basilisk mobile artillery, Manticore rocket artillery, Chimera armoured troop transport and the Sentinel walker. Because they require so many units, an Imperial Guard army can be expensive and time-consuming to assemble and paint. In regards to their weak infantry, when they don't vastly outnumber the enemy, the guardsmen rely on their unique tanks and fire support.

In a later Codex, the Imperial Guard "doctrines" were removed, replaced by the "orders" system. Units designated by the "order" must be in a specific distance radius from either a Platoon Officer or a HQ Officer. Benefits are given if both the officer's unit and the squad receiving the order have "vox-casters" (in-universe term for "radio").

In addition to baseline humans, the Imperial Guard also contains several types of abhumans — humans evolved from radically different planetary environment over tens of thousands of years that differ markedly from the norm. The two species most commonly found are the Ogryns (the counterpart of the Warhammer Fantasy setting ogres) whose superhuman strength and incredibly tough resilience makes them excellent close combat fighters and the Ratlings (resembling halflings/hobbits) who function as expert snipers and trackers.

One of the more distinctive aspects of the Imperial Guard army is its Commissars. They are represented as akin to the ruthless, political commissars of the former Soviet Union. The Imperial Commissar, as described by many Warhammer novelists, is given complete jurisdiction to judge the actions of any trooper or officer and to act accordingly. This includes up to summary execution of units who display disobedience or cowardice (in gameplay, this is an often useful function that boosts the morale of wavering units and prevents possessed psykers from harming their comrades) This is useful for the Imperium who must keep an ever-watchful eye in case their subjects turn to chaos. Understandably, they are much hated by the guardsmen they serve with. Many novels hint that a good portion of the Commissars slain in battle are "accidentally" hit by friendly fire; the 4th-Edition Codex for the notoriously anti-authoritarian Catachan regiments of the Imperial Guard includes the "Oops, Sorry Sir" rule that gives Commissar models included in a Catachan army a 1-in-6 chance of having been killed – or more appropriately, fragged – before the game begins. The Death Korps of Krieg are famous for killing Commissars/CO's should ever they commit cowardice themselves and attempt to flee.  There are also hints that most if not all Commissars primarily inspire troops by heroic or suicidal example, hoping to emulate figures like the "heroic" Commissar Ciaphas Cain or Colonel-Commissar Ibram Gaunt.

Another unique aspect of the Imperial Guard is that the models for the regiments of different worlds are physically distinct, rather than the same models with different paint schemes like the other armies (save the Space Marines where the Blood Angels, Dark Angels, Space Wolves, and Grey Knights Chapters all have models specific to them which other Chapters may not field and as such are considered separate armies). For example, the models for the Cadian Shock Troops resemble the soldiers of the Mobile Infantry as seen in the movie Starship Troopers and the Catachan Jungle Fighters appear in the stripped down uniforms as worn by American and Australian soldiers during the Vietnam War, and as seen in movies such as Rambo – a look befitting the inhabitants of a jungle world where everything is trying to kill them.

As a single platoon contains several squads, and each squad has options for taking special and heavy weapons, a single troops choice can take a staggering amount of said weapons: a fully loaded platoon may take up to 11 special weapons and 20 heavy weapons in a single troops choice, while most other armies can only take one of each. This, combined with the heavy firepower of Guard vehicles, produces an army that is primarily geared toward firepower. To offset this and create a proper balance to the game, the designers made the average Imperial Guardsman both physically weaker and less skilled with their weapons. This means that should an enemy withstand the blistering hail of weapons fire and close the distance to assault the Guardsman in melee, the Guardsmen will more than likely be torn apart.

Some of the major strengths of the Imperial Guard army are their vehicles. From the fragile, but mobile Scout Sentinel to the devastatingly destructive Leman Russ Demolisher firing small nuclear weapons to the long ranged Basilisk self-propelled howitzer, the vehicles of the Imperial Guard can significantly add to their effectiveness as an army. Although individual tanks from other armies (such as the Necrons) may sport more firepower, speed, and/or armour than those of the Imperial Guard, the Guard has, overall, the most powerful and varied armoured force, with many devastatingly powerful units like the Baneblade Super heavy Tank and it's many variants, or the DeathStrike ICBM Launcher platform (armed with plasma warheads) being added to the possibilities.

Video games

The Imperial Guard make several appearances in many of the video games that occur in the Warhammer 40,000 universe.

The Imperial Guard make a guest appearance in the single player campaign of Warhammer 40,000: Dawn of War led by Colonel Carus Brom as NPCs and playable units in some missions. They have since been expanded into a playable faction in the game's expansion packs:

The Imperial Guard were part of the Imperium's force in Final Liberation: Warhammer Epic 40,000, the other two parts consisting of the Space Marines and the Adeptus Mechanicus Titan legions.

The Imperial Guard also make appearances as opposition in the Warhammer 40,000: Fire Warrior first-person shooter. Among the possible opponents, there are guardsman equipped with lasguns, autogun-wielding stormtroopers, officers with chainswords and a Valkyrie Gunship as a boss.

The Imperial Guard has also made an appearance in the computer game Warhammer 40,000: Rites of War, usually used alongside Space Marine forces (much like in the Final Liberation).

Much like in the original Dawn of War the Imperial Guard (more specifically stormtroopers and regular guardsmen squads) make a supporting appearance as NPCs in Warhammer 40,000: Dawn of War II during several campaign battles, including the ending mission against the Tyranids. They also appeared in its expansion, Chaos Rising, with some guardsmen becoming traitorous and pledging their loyalties to Chaos in the early missions on Aurelia.

In Warhammer 40,000: Dawn of War II – Retribution, the Imperial Guard have become a fully playable race and are most dangerous when they field a large number of tanks or a huge horde of infantry.

In Warhammer 40,000: Space Marine, the Cadian 203rd regiment (so battered up it is under the command of a second lieutenant) is trying to survive on Graia, an adeptus mechanicus forgeworld, as the player's Ultramarines squad drops in. Guardsmen serve as NPCs throughout the game, and both the Guard and the player provide mutual support in terms of combat, navigation and air transport.

Bibliography

 
 

 Imperial Guard Homepage from the UK Games Workshop website. URL accessed on 9 January 2006.

References

Fictional military organizations
Imperium (Warhammer 40,000)

fi:Warhammer-universumi#Imperial Guard